QB may refer to:

Arts and entertainment
Quratulain Balouch (قراۃ العین بلوچ) a singer from Pakistan known by the stage name QB
 Quantum Break, a 2016 video game
 Quest Beat, a game software label
 Kyubey, a fictional character of the Puella Magi Madoka Magica

Places
 Qualicum Beach, a town on Vancouver Island, British Columbia, Canada
 Quarry Bay, a place in Hong Kong
 Quebec, sometimes abbreviated QB, although its official postal code is QC
 Queens, a borough of New York City
 Queens Boulevard, a boulevard in the borough of Queens in New York City
 Queensbridge, Queens, the largest public housing development in North America

Science and technology
 ATCvet code QB for Blood and blood forming organs, a section of the Anatomical Therapeutic Chemical Classification System
 QuickBASIC, a programming language
 QuickBooks, accounting software

Other uses
 QB (New York City Subway service), a former New York City Subway service, whose route is now served by the Q train
 Quarterback, a position in American and Canadian football
 Queen's Bench (disambiguation), a name of some courts in England, Wales and Canada
 Quiet Birdmen, a secret club for male aviators in the U.S.
 Quiz bowl, an academic quiz game
 Sky Georgia (IATA airline code QB)

See also 
 Cuby & the Blizzards
 1992 QB1, the first known classical Kuiper belt object, now named Albion